Military ranks and rank insignia of Norway were changed June 1, 2016, with the reintroduction of the Non-Commissioned Officer Corps, and the abolishment of the one-tier officer system in place since 1975.

New system of 2016
The Storting adopted in 2015 the new scheme for military personnel, Militærordningen. From 2016, the Norwegian Defence Forces have two career ladders for the military personnel; one officer scheme for personnel with a degree from the military academy, or a university degree and qualification courses, and a non-commissioned officer scheme for personnel with non-commissioned officer school.

Commissioned officers
The rank insignia for commissioned officers for the army, navy and air force respectively.

Enlisted
The following are the rank insignia for enlisted for the army, navy and air force respectively.

Historic ranks

System 1916–1930

Officers

Enlisted

System ?–1975

Officers

Enlisted

System 1975–2016
Norway did not have a non-commissioned officer system and thus Sergeant and Petty officer are grouped with the officers under the common designation befal. The officers are divided into three groups: The befal (company officers, ranks Ensign to Captain inclusive), the staff officers (stabsoffiser, ranks Major to brigadier inclusive), and the generals (Major General to General inclusive).

Fenrik (Ensign) used to be referred to as Second Lieutenant (Norwegian: Fenrik), while the rank of lieutenant went by First Lieutenant. The rank of Brigadier is not an old tradition in the Norwegian armed forces and was instated as a replacement for Oberst I (First Colonel); what is now Oberst used to be Oberst II (Second Colonel). As shown, the Cavalry have two ranks which differ from the regular Army: Dragon (Dragoon) instead of Menig (Private), and Rittmester (Rittmeister) instead of Kaptein (Captain).

The ranks of Grenader and Matros were bestowed upon soldiers who have finished the 12 months compulsory service and had signed one or more three-year contracts to continue serving. The ranks of Visekorporal/Visekonstabel/Vingsoldat (Corporal/Leading Rate) were usually ascribed to soldiers with long and/or outstanding service, though may be bestowed on soldiers with extra responsibilities (e.g. the shift-commander among a group of soldiers on guard-duty). A UB-Korporal/Kvartermesteraspirant (Rate Corporal/Petty Officer-in-training) was a soldier who has finished the UB course (Utskrevet Befalskurs), a course intended to prepare conscripted soldiers for non-commissioned officer duties, but still under training in "the field". After one-year course and service these soldiers were qualified for the rank of Sersjant or Kvartermester.

Officers

Enlisted
The rank insignia for enlisted for the army, navy and air force respectively.

References

Military ranks of Norway
Norway